"Professional Widow" is a song written by American singer-songwriter Tori Amos, released on her third album, Boys for Pele (1996). It is a harpsichord-driven rock song with lyrics that may reference American songwriter Courtney Love.

"Professional Widow" was released on July 2, 1996, as the third single from the Boys for Pele album in the US, containing remixes by the house music producers Armand van Helden and MK. The single reached number one on the US Billboard Hot Dance Music/Club Play chart. In Italy, the original version peaked at number two in October 1996.

An edited version of the Armand's Star Trunk Funkin' Mix of "Professional Widow" was originally released as a double A-side single with "Hey Jupiter" in Europe and Australia. On December 30, 1996, the single was released as an A-side in the United Kingdom as "Professional Widow (It's Got to Be Big)", which topped the UK Singles Chart in January 1997 and reached the top 20 in Finland, Iceland, Ireland and Norway. This release contained additional remixes of the track by Mr. Roy.

Lyric
"Professional Widow" is rumored to be about American songwriter Courtney Love, the widow of the Nirvana songwriter Kurt Cobain. Love said she had never determined if she was the professional widow of the title. In 1996, Amos said she had never met Love and that the song was about her own experience and "the part of myself that's Lady Macbeth". In a 2003 television interview, when the host said the song was inspired by Love, Amos interrupted with "allegedly" and smiled.

Remix
"Professional Widow" was remixed by American DJ Armand van Helden. Van Helden said that Amos was contractually entitled to approve all remixes, and when the remix became popular in Europe, she called to thank him. In a 1998 interview with Music & Media, Amos said: "It did kick my ass a bit [...] I know what Van Helden took and what he did and I think he did some very clever things. Obviously they're two different pieces of work, the original 'Professional Widow' is such a different read and I loved the fact that he didn't try and retain that at all, he went completely to the other pole."

Critical reception
Scottish newspaper Aberdeen Press and Journal called the song "excellent". Justin Chadwick from Albumism wrote in his retrospective review of Boys for Pele, "Though much of the world is more familiar with the propulsive, dancefloor-filling Armand Van Helden remix of 'Professional Widow', its original incarnation featured here is noteworthy for its much-debated allusions to none other than Courtney Love." Neil Z. Yeung from AllMusic described it as a "powerful dose of industrial-piano ferocity that holds nothing back in its demands for peace, love, and a little something extra." Paul Verna from Billboard picked it as a "highlight" of the album, viewing it as "searing" and "groove-heavy". The Daily Vault's Sean McCarthy felt it is one of the most "straightforward" songs of the album. Alan Jones from Music Week deemed the remix as a "brilliant reworking" and remarked that "it is as different from the rest of the album as chalk is from cheese." 

Tim Jeffery from Record Mirrors Dance Update rated it five out of five, adding, "Needless to say, any lyrical subtlety has gone out of the window on this remixed package but that's not the point really. MK and Armand Van Helden pick and choose which of Tori's lines to chop up into bits and loop over their own music — Helden's is by far the most inventive with loads of strange synth sounds over a Bucketheads-style groove and a terrific atmospheric drop in the middle. A big club hit for sure but it'll be radio that decides this record's success or otherwise." Cynthia Joyce from Salon noted that Amos' "penchant for abrupt endings and ad nauseam repetition; still surfaces on more experimental songs" like "Professional Widow".

Music video
A music video was made for the "Star Trunk Funkin' Mix", but it was simply a collection of clips from other Tori Amos videos edited together. It is the only video from between 1991 and 1998 that does not appear on Tori Amos: Complete Videos 1991-1998.

A live performance of the song is featured on the Welcome to Sunny Florida DVD. The performance features Jon Evans on bass and Matt Chamberlain on drums, while Amos plays the piano. This version mutes out any instances of "fucker," and the last word, "cock".

Impact and legacy
Rolling Stone ranked "Professional Widow" number 109 in its list of "200 Greatest Dance Songs of All Time" in 2022.

Track listings

US "Professional Widow" single
 Maxi-CD
 "Professional Widow" (LP mix) – 4:31
 "Professional Widow" (Armand's Star Trunk Funkin' mix) – 8:08
 "Professional Widow" (MK mix) – 7:20
 "Professional Widow" (Just da Funk dub) – 3:44
 "Professional Widow" (MK Vampire dub) – 6:56
 "Professional Widow" (Armand's instrumental) – 5:35
 "Professional Widow" (bonus beats) – 4:31

 12-inch vinyl
A1. "Professional Widow" (Armand's Star Trunk Funkin' mix) – 8:08
A2. "Professional Widow" (Just da Funk dub) – 3:44
B1. "Professional Widow" (MK mix) – 7:20
B2. "Professional Widow" (MK Vampire dub) – 6:56

"Hey Jupiter" / "Professional Widow"
 UK and Australian CD single
 "Hey Jupiter" (The Dakota version) – 6:03
 "Professional Widow" (Armand's Star Trunk Funkin' mix radio edit) – 3:45
 "Sugar" (live) – 5:43
 "Honey" (live) – 4:19

 UK 12-inch single
A1. "Professional Widow" (Armand's Star Trunk Funkin' mix) – 8:08
B1. "Hey Jupiter" (The Dakota version) (radio edit) – 4:14
B2. "Talula" (BT's Synethasia mix) – 11:27

 UK cassette single
 "Hey Jupiter" (The Dakota version) – 6:03
 "Professional Widow" (Armand's Star Trunk Funkin' mix radio edit) – 3:45

"Professional Widow (It's Got to Be Big)"
 UK CD single
 "Professional Widow (It's Got to Be Big)" (Armand's Star Trunk Funkin' mix radio edit) – 3:45
 "Professional Widow (It's Got to Be Big)" (Mr Roy's 7-inch edit) – 3:47
 "Professional Widow (It's Got to Be Big)" (Armand's Star Trunk Funkin' mix) – 8:06
 "Professional Widow (It's Got to Be Big)" (Mr Roy's Cosmic Cottage mix) – 7:55
 "Professional Widow (It's Got to Be Big)" (Just da Funk dub) – 3:31

 UK 12-inch single
A1. "Professional Widow (It's Got to Be Big)" (Mr Roy's Cosmic Cottage mix) – 7:55
A2. "Professional Widow (It's Got to Be Big)" (Mr Roy's 7-inch edit) – 3:47
B1. "Professional Widow (It's Got to Be Big)" (Armand's Star Trunk Funkin' mix) – 8:06
B2. "Professional Widow (It's Got to Be Big)" (Just da Funk dub) – 3:31

 UK cassette single
 "Professional Widow (It's Got to Be Big)" (Mr Roy's 7-inch edit) – 3:47
 "Professional Widow (It's Got to Be Big)" (Armands Star Trunk Funkin' mix) – 8:06

 European maxi-CD single
 "Professional Widow" (Armand's Star Trunk Funkin' mix radio edit) – 3:45
 "Professional Widow" (Armand's Star Trunk Funkin' mix) – 8:08
 "Professional Widow" (MK mix) – 7:20
 "Professional Widow" (MK Vampire dub) – 6:56

 French maxi-CD single
 "Professional Widow" (Mr Roy's 7-inch edit) – 3:47
 "Professional Widow" (Mr Roy's Cosmic Cottage mix) – 7:55
 "Professional Widow" (Armands Star Trunk Funkin' mix) – 8:06
 "In the Springtime of His Voodoo" (Hasbrouck Heights club mix) – 10:00

Personnel
Personnel are lifted from the Boys for Pele album booklet. The album version includes the cry of a bull, which is credited as "bull" in the booklet.

 Tori Amos – writing, vocals, harpsichord, Bösendorfer, production
 Alan Friedman – drum programming
 George Porter Jr. – bass guitar
 Manu Katche – drums
 Steve Caton – guitar
 Bull – bull

 Mark Hawley – recording, mixing (coda)
 Marcel van Limbeek – recording, mixing (coda)
 Rob van Tuin – recording assistant
 Bob Clearmountain – mixing
 Ryan Freeland – mixing assistant
 Bob Ludwig – mastering

Charts

Weekly charts

Year-end charts

Certifications

Release history

See also
 List of number-one dance singles of 1996 (U.S.)
 List of artists who reached number one on the U.S. dance chart

References

External links
 Professional Widow page at hereinmyhead.com
 Misheard lyrics of Professional Widow at Am I Right

Tori Amos songs
1996 singles
1996 songs
Atlantic Records singles
East West Records singles
Songs written by Tori Amos
UK Singles Chart number-one singles